Sheikh Sabah III Al-Salim Al-Sabah (12 April 1913 – 31 December 1977) was the Emir of the State of Kuwait from 24 November 1965 until his death in 1977. The youngest son of Salim Al-Mubarak Al-Sabah, Sabah succeeded his half-brother Abdullah Al-Salim Al-Sabah upon his death in 1965. He suspended parliament in late August 1976 for four years, claiming it was acting against the nation. He was the 12th ruler in the family dynasty.

Prior to his ascension, Sabah served as the president of the Police Directorate from 1953 to 1959, President of the public health department from 1959 to 1961, Deputy Prime Minister and Minister of Foreign Affairs from 1962 to 1963, and Prime Minister of Kuwait from 1963 to 1965. He was appointed as Crown Prince on 29 October 1962.

Death
Sabah Al-Salim died from cancer in 1977 at the age of 64.

Honours and awards

National 
:
  Sovereign Grand Master of the Order of Mubarak the Great.
   Sovereign Grand Master of the Order of Kuwait.
  Sovereign Grand Master of the Order of National Defense.
  Sovereign Grand Master of the Military Duty Order.

Foreign 
  Commemorative Medal of the 2500th Anniversary of the founding of the Persian Empire (14 October 1971).

References

20th-century rulers in Asia
1913 births
1977 deaths
Foreign ministers of Kuwait
Government ministers of Kuwait
House of Al-Sabah
Honorary Knights Commander of the Order of St Michael and St George
Prime Ministers of Kuwait
Rulers of Kuwait
Deaths from cancer in Kuwait